Eaglesfield Park is a public park situated close to the top of Shooter's Hill, south of Woolwich, in the Royal Borough of Greenwich in south east London.

Overview 
The park is in two sections divided by Eaglesfield Road. The western section is landscaped and includes a children's playground and a pond; the eastern section is a grassland meadow, and is adjacent to a golf course. The Green Chain Walk passes through the western section of the park.

Eaglesfield was purchased by Woolwich Metropolitan Borough Council in 1907, with half the funds contributed by London City Council. LCC's chief officer of parks JJ Sexby laid out the park, which was opened in 1908. Sexby's design included enhancements to an existing ornamental pond. Over time this became derelict and abandoned, but was restored in 2012.

The park's name may derive from the two eagles depicted on the coat of arms of local 18th-century landowner John Lidgebird, or because Shooters Hill was known as a roost for eagles in medieval times.

References

Parks and open spaces in the Royal Borough of Greenwich
Woolwich